Wonderful is the seventh studio album by the British band Madness, released on 1 November 1999. It was the band's first studio album in fourteen years since Mad Not Mad in 1985, and also the first to feature their classic seven-piece line-up since 1984's Keep Moving. The album saw Madness reunite with their original production team, Clive Langer and Alan Winstanley, who had produced all of the band's previous work.

Reception

The BBC's Chris Charles said "... Wonderful finds the boys in their best form since 1981's Madness 7." Allmusic's Evan Cater gave the album 4 out of 5 stars and said "On the whole, it's a pretty successful return." In a review of the 2010 re-release, Terry Staunton of Record Collector stated that although "All the essential components are in place...something doesn’t quite gel…".  Staunton thought the opening single "Lovestruck" was well done but "elsewhere there’s a niggling feeling that the band are trying too hard to replicate the sound of yore, studiously ignoring the fact that times – and the players themselves – have changed."

Track listing

2010 reissue
Disc 1 - the original album
Contains the full album plus three promo videos
The promo videos

"Lovestruck" 
"Johnny the Horse" 
"Drip Fed Fred" 

Disc 2 - the bonus tracks

Chart performance

Personnel
Madness
 Graham "Suggs" McPherson – lead vocals
 Mike Barson – keyboards
 Chris Foreman – guitar
 Mark Bedford – bass
 Lee Thompson – saxophones, guest vocals on track 6
 Daniel Woodgate – drums
 Cathal Smyth – backing vocals, lead vocals on track 3

Additional personnel
 Jason Bruer – saxophone 
 Terry Edwards – saxophone, brass arrangements 
 Michael Kearsey – trombone 
 Jason McDermid – trumpet 
 Pablo Cook – percussion
 The London Session Orchestra – strings
 Gavyn Wright – orchestral and strings leader
 Simon Hale – string arrangements, conductor
 Ian Dury – guest vocals on track 6
 Steve Donnelley – dobro guitar on track 5
 Mitch – backing vocals on track 4
 Sarah Cracknell – backing vocals on track 8

Technical
 Clive Langer – production
 Alan Winstanley – production
 Mark Bishop – assistant engineer
 Martin Parr – front cover photography
 Mark Bedford – design
 Robert Stimpson – design
 Dani Golfieri – design assistant
 Neil Evans – design assistant
2010 reissue
 Tim Turan – remastering
 Martin "Cally" Callomon – art direction, design  
 Nik Rose – artwork ("re-jigging and fettling") 
 Robert Elms – liner notes

Notes
 "4 am" is a re-recorded version of the song that appeared on Suggs' solo album The Lone Ranger in 1995.
 "If I Didn't Care" is a cover of a song originally recorded by the Ink Spots.
 Providing the vocals to "Drip Fed Fred" would be Ian Dury's last chart single release and final TV appearance on The National Lottery Show before his death in March 2000.
 Despite being the title of the album, "You're Wonderful" only made it as a b-side on one of the editions of the "Johnny the Horse" single. However, it is included on the Japanese version of the album, along with another song which was a b-side in the UK: "Round and Round".

References

External links

1999 albums
Madness (band) albums
Virgin Records albums
Albums produced by Alan Winstanley
Albums produced by Clive Langer